Tommy Schram (born 9 November 1971 in Denmark) is a Danish retired footballer who now works as a salesman at Ljungdahl in his home country.

Career

Schram started his senior career with Brøndby IF, where he made fifty-nine appearances and scored twelve goals. After that, he played for Danish club Herfølge Boldklub, Icelandic club Íþróttabandalag Vestmannaeyja, English club Yeovil Town, and Danish club Vejle Boldklub before retiring in 2004.

References 

Danish men's footballers
Danish expatriate men's footballers
1971 births
Expatriate footballers in Malaysia

Vejle Boldklub players
Brøndby IF players
Íþróttabandalag Vestmannaeyja players
Yeovil Town F.C. players
Association football midfielders
Expatriate footballers in Iceland
Herfølge Boldklub players
Living people
Expatriate footballers in England